George Miller was an American football coach.  He was the second head football coach at Kansas Wesleyan University in Salina, Kansas, serving for one season, in 1906, and compiling a record of 0–1.

References

Year of birth missing
Year of death missing
Kansas Wesleyan Coyotes football coaches